Operation Mawtini was launched on 15 July 2007 by the Regimental Combat Team 2, located in western Al Anbar province, to neutralize attempts by anti-Iraqi Forces to re-establish a presence in key urban areas along the Euphrates River valley.

The operation called for over 9,000 U.S. Marines, soldiers, and sailors, along with elements of the Iraqi Army, to strike deep into the less-traveled regions of RCT-2's operating area.

History
Operation Mawtini, which included the Iraqi Army's 2nd and 3rd Brigades of the 7th Division, began on the heels of Operation Harris Ba’sil which had provided a better picture of enemy movement patterns and safe havens. The information gained during Harris Ba’sil allowed the Regiment to conduct focused disruption and security operations in those areas critical to the enemy.

Participating units

American units

Iraqi units
 2nd Brigade, 7th Division
 3rd Brigade, 7th Division

See also

References

External links
Operation Mawtini

Military operations of the Iraq War involving the United States
Military operations of the Iraq War involving Iraq
Military operations of the Iraq War in 2007
Iraqi insurgency (2003–2011)
United States Marine Corps in the Iraq War